Abinash Bohara (born 30 July 1997) is a Nepalese cricketer. He is a right-handed batsman who bowls right arm medium fast.

Early life and career
Bohara was born in Salyan. As a child, he always wanted to join the army. However, after failing to succeed in the Army trials, he commenced his cricket journey representing the Nepalgunj [then region no. 5] U19 cricket team. He scalped seven wickets (three against Baitadi and four against Birgunj) in two matches for Nepalgunj in the 2014 National U19 Cricket Tournament and that, he believes, gave him more confidence in choosing cricket as a career option.

International career
After good performances in the domestic leagues, he was named in Nepal's Twenty20 International (T20I) squad for their series against the United Arab Emirates in January 2019. He made his T20I debut for Nepal against the United Arab Emirates on 31 January 2019. He was named the player of the series, after taking six wickets in the three matches. In June 2019, he was named in Nepal's squad for the Regional Finals of the 2018–19 ICC T20 World Cup Asia Qualifier tournament.

In November 2019, he was named in Nepal's squad for the 2019 ACC Emerging Teams Asia Cup in Bangladesh. He made his List A debut for Nepal, against Hong Kong, in the Emerging Teams Cup on 16 November 2019. Later the same month, he was also named in Nepal's squad for the men's cricket tournament at the 2019 South Asian Games. The Nepal team won the bronze medal, after they beat the Maldives by five wickets in the third-place playoff match.

In January 2020, he was named in Nepal's One Day International (ODI) squad for the 2020 Nepal Tri-Nation Series. He made his ODI debut for Nepal, against Oman, on 5 February 2020. In September 2020, he was one of eighteen cricketers to be awarded with a central contract by the Cricket Association of Nepal.

References

External links
 

1997 births
Living people
Nepalese cricketers
Nepal One Day International cricketers
Nepal Twenty20 International cricketers
South Asian Games bronze medalists for Nepal
South Asian Games medalists in cricket
People from Salyan District, Nepal